Bihar Institute of Law is a Law school situated beside Bailey Road at Ashiana More, Raja Bazaar in Patna in the Indian state of Bihar. It offers undergraduate 3 years LL.B. and 5 years integrated law course which is approved by Bar Council of India (BCI), New Delhi and affiliated to Patliputra University.

History
Law Society of Bihar established by senior advocates of Patna High Court and academicians of Patna. Bihar Institute of Law was established in January 1984 by the Law Society for imparting legal education.

References

Law schools in Bihar
Universities and colleges in Bihar
Educational institutions established in 1984
1984 establishments in Bihar